"Chapter 1: The Mandalorian" is the premiere episode of the American streaming television series The Mandalorian. It was written by the series' showrunner Jon Favreau, directed by Dave Filoni, and released on Disney+ on November 12, 2019. The episode stars Pedro Pascal as The Mandalorian, a lone bounty hunter who is given a mission by the mysterious Client (co-star Werner Herzog). The episode won two Primetime Emmy Awards.

Plot
Five years after the fall of the Empire, a Mandalorian bounty hunter collects a fugitive (and saves the fugitive's life) after a scuffle in a bar on the ice planet Pagodon and returns to the planet Nevarro in his ship, the Razor Crest. He meets Greef Karga, the leader of the bounty hunters guild, but he only offers low-paying bounties that will not cover travel expenses. Looking to get a bigger bounty, the Mandalorian accepts a mysterious commission, for which Karga can only provide an address, to meet the Client, who wants the details of the job to be private.

The Client, who uses Imperial stormtroopers as bodyguards, gives the Mandalorian a vague target to bring back alive. The only information he is allowed to give is an age—50 years old—and last known location. In exchange, The Client promises to reward the bounty hunter with a container full of beskar, a rare metal used by Mandalorians to forge their armor. Receiving a single bar of beskar as a down payment, the Mandalorian meets with the Armorer at an enclave housing fellow Mandalorians. The Armorer, who melts the metal into a pauldron reserved for the Mandalorian, says the metal was gathered in The Great Purge and the excess will sponsor foundlings, as the Mandalorian once was.

The Mandalorian travels to a desert planet Arvala-7, and meets a native named Kuiil who wants to be rid of the criminals and mercenaries who now inhabit the area. Kuiil teaches the Mandalorian to ride a Blurrg, as there are no land-speed vehicles to traverse the area, and sends him to where his bounty is located. Upon reaching the hideout, the Mandalorian grudgingly teams up with the bounty droid IG-11. They manage to clear the entire facility of its Nikto guards and discover that the bounty is a green, big-eared childlike creature. IG-11 plans to kill it, but the Mandalorian blasts the droid to protect the baby and bounty.

Production

Conception
Disney announced that a new live action Star Wars series would be released on Disney+ on November 12, 2019. The series cost over US$100 million to make averaging at US$15 million per episode. "Chapter 1: The Mandalorian" was directed by Dave Filoni, in his live-action directorial debut. He is known for his work on the Star Wars: The Clone Wars series and Star Wars Rebels. The episode was written by showrunner and executive producer Jon Favreau.

Casting
In November 2018, it was announced that Pedro Pascal had been cast as The Mandalorian, the protagonist of the series. After meeting with Favreau, Pascal initially thought he would be playing Boba Fett. Also in November 2018, it was announced that Nick Nolte had been cast as the voice of Kuiil. On December 12, 2018, it was announced that Carl Weathers, Werner Herzog, and Omid Abtahi had joined the main cast as Greef Karga, The Client, and Dr. Pershing, respectively. On March 21, 2019, Taika Waititi was revealed to be recording a voice for the series, speculated to be bounty hunter droid IG-88, but which turned out to be a new character named IG-11.

Additional guest starring actors cast for this episode include John Beasley as a bartender, Horatio Sanz as a Mythrol bounty, Tait Fletcher as Alpha Trawler, Ryan Watson as Beta Trawler, Dmitrious Bistrevsky as Quarren Trawler, Christopher Bartlett as a ferryman, Brian Posehn as a speeder pilot, and Emily Swallow as The Armorer. Brendan Wayne and Lateef Crowder are credited as stunt doubles for The Mandalorian. Wayne had worked closely with Pascal to develop the character. Misty Rosas and Rio Hackford are credited as performance artists for Kuiil and IG-11, respectively. "The Child" was performed by various puppeteers.

Filming
Principal photography began in the first week of October 2018 in Southern California.

Music
Ludwig Göransson composed the musical score for the episode. The soundtrack album for the episode was released on November 12, 2019.

Reception

Critical response
"Chapter 1: The Mandalorian" received generally positive reviews. On Rotten Tomatoes the episode has an approval rating of 90% based on reviews from 81 critics, with an average rating of 7.7/10. The website's critics consensus states, "Though its character building leaves something to be desired, "Chapter 1" is a visual feast with enough sense of adventure to inspire hope that the force may be strong with The Mandalorian".

Alan Sepinwall of Rolling Stone wrote: ""Fun" is also probably the best word I can apply to the compact Mandalorian premiere. Favreau and Filoni do an effective job introducing us to this corner of the franchise, and to the rough, desperate circumstances of the title character." Caroline Framke of Variety wrote: "Less concerned with capturing the magic of Star Wars than roughing it up a bit. Even when The Mandalorian lags, its swerve from a more expected route makes it more intriguing as an entryway into a galaxy far, far away." Brian Tallerico of RogerEbert.com said the premiere was "like the character at the show's center, this guy knows the job. Hook the viewer, and keep them hooked as the monthly subscription cost renews. 'The Mandalorian' feels likely to do exactly that". Keith Phipps of Vulture stated "The Mandalorian rises, [...] digging into the seedy underbelly glimpsed in Episode IV's cantina scene and throughout Rogue One". Melanie McFarland of Salon said the "Force is strong with The Mandalorian debut". Lorraine Ali of the Los Angeles Times described the first episode as "a safe, entertaining blockbuster".

Emily St. James of Vox Media had a more lukewarm reception, stating "The Mandalorian blends Star Wars, Spaghetti Westerns, and prestige TV. It's fine. But shouldn't Disney+ want more than fine?" St. James additionally described the first five minutes as "stretched out".

Awards

The episode won two Primetime Emmy Awards: Outstanding Production Design for a Narrative Program (Half-Hour or Less) and Outstanding Sound Editing for a Comedy or Drama Series (Half-Hour) and Animation.

Notes

References

External links
 
 

2019 American television episodes
American television series premieres
Television shows directed by Dave Filoni
The Mandalorian episodes